Nemesio de Guzman (8 December 1916 – 1944) was a Filipino sprinter. He competed in the men's 100 metres at the 1936 Summer Olympics. He was killed in action during World War II.

References

External links
 

1916 births
1944 deaths
Sportspeople from Pangasinan
Athletes (track and field) at the 1936 Summer Olympics
Filipino male sprinters
Olympic track and field athletes of the Philippines
Place of birth missing
Filipino military personnel killed in World War II